The men's canoe sprint C-2 1,000 metres at the 2012 Olympic Games in London took place between 7 and 9 August at Eton Dorney.

German pairing Peter Kretschmer and Kurt Kuschela won the gold medal. Belarus won silver and Russia took bronze.

Competition format

The competition comprised heats, semi-finals, and a final round.  Heat winners advanced to the 'A' final, with all other boats getting a second chance in the semi-finals.  The top three from each semifinal also advanced to the 'A' final, and competed for medals.  A placing 'B' final was held for the other semi-finalists.

Schedule

All times are British Summer Time (UTC+01:00)

Results

Heats
The fastest boat qualified for the final, remainder went through to the semi-finals.

Heat 1

Heat 2

Semifinals
The fastest three canoeists in each semi-final qualified for the 'A' final. The slowest two canoeists in each semi-final qualified for the placing 'B' final.

Semifinal 1

Semifinal 2

Finals

Final B

Final A

References

Canoeing at the 2012 Summer Olympics
Men's events at the 2012 Summer Olympics